Guangdong-Hong Kong Cup 1992–93 is the 15th staging of this two-leg football competition between Hong Kong and Guangdong.

The first leg was played in Mong Kok Stadium on 3 January 1993 while the second leg was played in Guangzhou on 10 January 1993.

Hong Kong captured champion by winning an aggregate 2–1 against Guangdong.

Squads

Hong Kong
The Hong Kong team consists mainly of players from Eastern and the team has 3 non-Hong Kong players. 
Some of the players in the squad include:
  Iain Hesford 希福特
  Yau Kin Wai 丘建威
  Wong Wai Tak 黃偉德
  Chiu Chun Ming 趙俊明
  Lee Wai Man 李偉文
  Lee Kin Wo 李健和
  Chan Chi Keung 陳志強
  Lo Kai Wah 羅繼華
  Ross Greer 基亞
  Tam Siu Wai 譚兆偉
  Dale Tempest 譚拔士
  Chung Ho Yin 鍾皓賢
  Trevor Quow 確路
  Au Wai Lun 歐偉倫

Guangdong
Some of the players in the squad includes:
 Peng Changying 彭昌穎
 Wu Qunli 吳群立
 Li Yong 李勇
 Ou Chuliang 區楚良

Trivia
 Ross Greer's goal at 1 min 48 s in the first leg is the fastest goal in the competition history.

Results
First Leg

Second Leg

References

 HKFA website 省港盃回憶錄(七) (in Chinese)

 

1992-93
1992–93 in Hong Kong football
1993 in Chinese football